Eremwu eu is a work song sung by women as they make cassava bread, as part of the Garifuna music tradition of Belize, Guatemala and Honduras.

External links 
 http://www.clas.ufl.edu/users/afburns/afrotrop/Garifuna.htm

References 

Garifuna music